General Security Service may refer to the following: 

 Shin Bet
 Palestinian Civil Police Force